The 2016 FIBA U16 Women's European Championship Division B was the 13th edition of the Division B of the European basketball championship for women's national under-16 teams. It was played in Oradea, Romania, from 5 to 14 August 2016. Poland women's national under-16 basketball team won the tournament.

Participating teams

  (14th place, 2015 FIBA Europe Under-16 Championship for Women Division A)

  (16th place, 2015 FIBA Europe Under-16 Championship for Women Division A)

  (1st place, 2015 FIBA Europe Under-16 Championship for Women Division C)

  (15th place, 2015 FIBA Europe Under-16 Championship for Women Division A)

First round
In the first round, the teams were drawn into four groups. The first two teams from each group will advance to the quarterfinals, the third and fourth teams will advance to the 9th–16th place playoffs, the other teams will play in the 17th–23rd place classification.

Group A

Group B

Group C

Group D

17th–23rd place classification

Group E

Playoffs

9th–16th place playoffs

Championship playoffs

Final standings

References

External links
FIBA official website

2016
2016–17 in European women's basketball
International youth basketball competitions hosted by Romania
Sport in Oradea
FIBA U16
August 2016 sports events in Europe